The 2014 Asian Men's Youth Handball Championship is the 6th edition of the Asian Men's Youth Handball Championship which was held from 6–15 September 2014 at Amman, Jordan under aegis of Asian Handball Federation. The tournament also acts as the qualification tournament for the 2015 Men's Youth World Handball Championship.

South Korea wins its 2nd Youth Men's title by beating Qatar in the final by 26-25 (Half Time 14-13).

Draw

Group A

 4/0/0 106-80 +26

 2/1/1 99-91 +8

 1/2/1 103-104 -1

 1/1/2 97-113 -16

 0/0/4 90-107 -17

Group B

 3/0/0 110-72 +38

 2/0/1 103-69 +34

 1/0/2 76-81 -5

 0/0/3 46-113 -67

Placement matches

7/8-place match

5/6-place match

Knockout stage

Semifinal matches

Bronze-medal match

Gold-medal match

Final standings

References

Asian Mens Youth Handball Championship, 2014
Asia
Asian Mens Youth Handball Championship
Asian Handball Championships
International handball competitions hosted by Jordan